David John "Skippy" Parsons (born 17 May 1959 in Devonport, Tasmania), is a retired Australian racing driver, who, while never a full-time racing driver, drove for some of the leading racing teams in Australia including the Holden Dealer Team, Perkins Engineering, Glenn Seton Racing and Gibson Motorsport.

Career

Group C
The son of Tasmanian touring car racer Graham Parsons, David Parsons, a dairy farmer, began emerging onto the national scene racing a Holden Commodore (VC) in the 1982 Australian Touring Car Championship, making his debut at his home track, Symmons Plains in Tasmania. Embraced as an endurance co-driver by gentleman privateer racer Peter Janson, he showed pace on his way to fourth outright at the 1982 James Hardie 1000, as well as qualifying Janson's Commodore 3rd for the 1983 race.

This, and his performances in his self-funded Commodore in the 1983 ATCC, brought him to the attention of Peter Brock and the Holden Dealer Team, and with the help of Janson he was drafted into the HDT for the 1984 Australian Endurance Championship. Parsons co-drove with John Harvey to a DNF in the Oran Park 250 in Brock's ATCC car, before the pair went on to finish 3rd in the 1984 Castrol 500 at Sandown in the second of the team's new VK Commodore's. From there Harvey/Parsons finished 2nd in the 1984 James Hardie 1000 behind teammates Brock and Larry Perkins, with Parsons following Brock across the finish line in a 1-2 form finish. Late in the James Hardie 1000, Parsons was "let off the leash" by team owner Brock who told him to go for second place which was held at the time by  Formula One World Champion Alan Jones who was driving Warren Cullen's similar VK Commodore. Parsons responded to the challenge and reduced the gap to the former World Champion from over a minute to under two seconds before Jones was forced to pit with 4 laps remaining for fuel and attention to the cars non-existent rear brakes (unfortunately for Jones, the stop not only saw Parsons go past but also Gregg Hansford in Allan Moffat's Mazda RX-7, dropping the Commodore to 4th place and off the podium).

After finishing 7th in the 1983 ATCC in his own privately entered Holden Commodore SS, Parsons drove his 1983 Bathurst Commodore for Peter Janson in the opening two rounds of the 1984 championship at Sandown and Symmons Plains, but Janson did not have the funds to run the full series and these were Parson's only drives in the championship which saw him fall to 17th in the standings.

Group A
Parsons was retained as a driver for the HDT into 1985, although results were harder to come by as the Commodore initially struggled with engine unreliability in Australia's move to the FIA's Group A rules.  The highlight of the year for the Tasmanian dairy farmer was out qualifying team leader Brock at the 1985 James Hardie 1000 (the only time that Brock as the HDT owner was out-qualified by a teammate). Parsons left HDT in 1986 to join Perkins in his new team Perkins Engineering, but was let go in early 1987 with Perkins opting for someone with "more experience" after Parsons had crashed the Commodore in the Wellington 500 (Perkins would select  World Champion Denny Hulme as Parsons replacement with the pair going on to win the Pukekohe 500 a week after Wellington). Parsons rejoined the HDT, now without any official support from Holden following the company's split with Brock in February 1987, and joined Brock and Neville Crichton at the Spa 24 Hours round of the inaugural World Touring Car Championship (WTCC). The trio failed to finish the race.

Heading into the 1987 James Hardie 1000 (which was also a round of the WTCC) the Holden Dealer Team was expected to do little more the make up the numbers against the strength of the factory supported European Ford and BMW teams. When the #05 car Parsons shared with Brock experienced a major engine failure in the early running, their effort looked set to be little more than a footnote (Brock had pitted a number of laps early and put Parsons into the car leading to speculation that Brock knew the engine was dying and wanted himself in the pits rather than stranded out on the track, though Parsons did manage to get the heavily smoking #05 back to the pits). First Brock, then Parsons stepped aboard the team's second car, #10 which had been driven to that point of the race by the 1983 Australian Endurance Champion Peter McLeod. Inspired driving on variable surface as rain plagued the second half of the race, good strategy and a lucky break with safety car procedure saw the team claw their way past the BMW M3s as they failed, and the Nissan Skyline turbos and into third position behind the flawless 1-2 finish of the Eggenberger Motorsport Ford Sierra RS500s. During his stint at the wheel, Parsons recorded a time of 2:25.37 on lap 129 which was credited as #10's fastest race lap in the 1987 1000 (Brock's fastest recorded time was a 2:25.55 on lap 90 while McLeod had posted a 2:26.58 on lap 58).

After scrutineering at Bathurst in 1987, there had been rumours about the legality of the Eggenberger built Sierra's, specifically to do with oversized wheel arches. On the Thursday before qualifying an official protest was lodged against the Sierra's, which was held over due to the lack of a road going RS500 in Australia to compare them with. Eventually, after nearly four months and an eventual disqualification and later appeal by Eggenberger, the two Sierras were disqualified for having oversize wheel arches allowing them to fit larger wheels, giving McLeod, Brock and Parsons the race win.

Parsons stayed with the team into 1988 as they transitioned from V8 Holden Commodore's to 4 cyl BMW M3s, although by now in Australia the giant killers of 1987 had become little more than class runners in the face of the all-powerful Sierras. After then sitting out 1989 during which time the Brock team also switched to running the RS500 Sierra's, Parsons returned to Brock's team in 1990, teaming with Andrew Miedecke and Charlie O'Brien to finish 11th at the 1990 Tooheys 1000 at Bathurst, 12 laps down on the winning Holden Racing Team SS Group A Commodore of Allan Grice and Win Percy.

Parsons then went on to join Glenn Seton Racing in 1991 where he became a regular co-driver for the team for the next seven years, continuing to race with the team into the V8 Supercar era. The highlight of his time with GSR was winning the 1993 Sandown 500 co-driving a Ford Falcon (EB) with Geoff Brabham and qualifying in the top ten at the 1991 Tooheys 1000 in a Sierra.

Parsons came close to winning his second Bathurst 1000 in 1995 when team boss and co-driver Glenn Seton led the race with just 10 laps to go. However, a dropped valve in the Barry Seton built Ford V8 saw the Ford Falcon (EF) retire on lap 152, handing the win to Parsons' former teammate Larry Perkins. The loss was hard to take as the car had led for most of the race and until the engine went sour on lap 151, Seton held a 10-second lead over Perkins. 1995 was also the 30th anniversary of Bo Seton's only win in 1965. Parsons was actually to drive the team's second car with lead driver Alan Jones, while veteran Allan Grice was entered as Seton's co-driver. However, after early practice had seen Parsons lapping quicker than Grice, Glenn Seton made the decision to move Parsons into the lead car with himself while Grice was moved to partner Jones. Ironically, the Jones/Grice car would finish second behind the Commodore of Perkins and Russell Ingall.

V8 Supercars
From 1998 onwards Parsons was a hired gun, driving for Gibson Motorsport and Owen Parkinson Racing, including co-drives with the other racing driver named David "Truckie" Parsons. His final Bathurst appearance was alongside Paul Romano in 2000. Since then Parsons has made occasional one-off appearances in various sedan based categories.

Career results

Complete Australian Touring Car Championship results
(key) (Races in bold indicate pole position) (Races in italics indicate fastest lap)

Complete World Touring Car Championship results
(key) (Races in bold indicate pole position) (Races in italics indicate fastest lap)

* Despite winning the James Hardie 1000 at Bathurst, Parsons scored no World Championship points as he wasn't a registered WTCC competitor.

Complete Asia-Pacific Touring Car Championship results
(key) (Races in bold indicate pole position) (Races in italics indicate fastest lap)

Complete Bathurst 1000 results

Complete Spa 24 Hours results

Complete Sandown Enduro results

References

Living people
1959 births
People from Devonport, Tasmania
Racing drivers from Tasmania
Australian Touring Car Championship drivers
Supercars Championship drivers
Bathurst 1000 winners
World Touring Car Championship drivers
24 Hours of Spa drivers
Australian Endurance Championship drivers